Tajima Station is the name of two train stations in Japan:

 Tajima Station (Nara) (但馬駅), a railway station in Miyake, Shiki District, Nara Prefecture, Japan
 Tajima Station (Tochigi) (田島駅), a train station in Sano, Tochigi Prefecture, Japan

See also 
 Tajima (disambiguation)